The ice hockey team rosters at the 1980 Winter Olympics consisted of the following players:

Canada
Glenn Anderson, Warren Anderson, Ken Berry, Dan D'Alvise, Ron Davidson, John Devaney, Bob Dupuis, Joe Grant, Randy Gregg, Dave Hindmarch, Paul MacLean, Kevin Maxwell, Jim Nill, Terry O'Malley, Paul Pageau, Brad Pirie, Kevin Primeau, Don Spring, Tim Watters, Stelio Zupancich

Czechoslovakia
Jiří Bubla, Milan Chalupa, Vítězslav Ďuriš, Miroslav Dvořák, Bohuslav Ebermann, Miroslav Fryčer, Karel Holý, František Kaberle, Arnold Kadlec, Jiří Králík, Karel Lang, Vincent Lukáč, Vladimír Martinec, Jan Neliba, Jiří Novák, Milan Nový, Jaroslav Pouzar, Anton Šťastný, Marián Šťastný, Peter Šťastný

Finland
Kari Eloranta, Hannu Haapalainen, Markku Hakulinen, Markku Kiimalainen, Antero Kivelä, Jukka Koskilahti, Hannu Koskinen, Jari Kurri, Mikko Leinonen, Reijo Leppänen, Tapio Levo, Lasse Litma, Jarmo Mäkitalo, Esa Peltonen, Jukka Porvari, Olli Saarinen, Seppo Suoraniemi, Timo Susi, Jorma Valtonen, Ismo Villa

Japan
Takeshi Azuma, Tadamitsu Fujii, Tsutomu Hanzawa, Sadaki Honma, Hiroshi Hori, Yoshio Hoshino, Mikio Hosoi, Norio Ito, Takeshi Iwamoto, Yoshiaki Kyoya, Katsutoshi Kawamura, Mikio Matsuda, Minoru Misawa, Satoru Misawa, Hitoshi Nakamura, Iwao Nakayama, Hideo Sakurai, Hideo Urabe, Osamu Wakabayashi, Koji Wakasa

Netherlands
Ron Berteling, Brian de Bruijn, John de Bruyn, Dick Decloe, Corky de Graauw, Jack de Heer, Henk Hille, Chuck Huizinga, Jan Janssen, William Klooster, Patrick Kolijn, Leo Koopmans, Ted Lenssen, George Peternousek, Al Pluymers, Klaas van den Broek, Rick van Gog, Harrie van Heumen, Frank van Soldt, Larry van Wieren,

Norway
Trond Abrahamsen, Knut Andresen, Knut Fjeldsgaard, Stephen Foyn, Øystein Jarlsbo, Morten Johansen, Vidar Johansen, Øivind Løsåmoen, Håkon Lundenes, Jim Marthinsen, Thor Martinsen, Rune Molberg, Geir Myhre, Nils Nilsen, Tore Falch Nilsen, Erik Pedersen, Tom Røymark, Morten Sethereng, Petter Thoresen, Thore Wålberg

Poland
Stefan Chowaniec, Bogdan Dziubiński, Henryk Gruth, Leszek Jachna, Andrzej Jańczy, Henryk Janiszewski, Wiesław Jobczyk, Stanisław Klocek, Leszek Kokoszka, Paweł Łukaszka, Andrzej Małysiak, Marek Marcińczak, Tadeusz Obłój, Jerzy Potz, Henryk Pytel, Dariusz Sikora, Ludwik Synowiec, Andrzej Ujwary, Henryk Wojtynek, Andrzej Zabawa,

Romania
Elöd Antal, István Antal, Dumitru Axinte, Ion Berdilă, Traian Cazan, Marian Costea, Şandor Gal, Alexandru Hălăucă, Gheorghe Huţan, George Justinian, Doru Moroşan, Béla Nagy, Zoltan Nagy, Valerian Netedu, Constantin Nistor, Adrian Olenici, Marian Pisaru, Mihail Lucian Popescu, László Sólyom, Doru Tureanu,

Soviet Union
Helmuts Balderis, Zinetula Bilyaletdinov, Viacheslav Fetisov, Aleksandr Golikov, Vladimir Golikov, Alexei Kasatonov, Valeri Kharlamov, Vladimir Krutov, Yuri Lebedev, Sergei Makarov, Aleksandr Maltsev, Boris Mikhailov, Vladimir Myshkin, Vasili Pervukhin, Vladimir Petrov, Aleksandr Skvortsov, Sergei Starikov, Vladislav Tretiak, Valeri Vasiliev, Viktor Zhluktov

Sweden
Mats Åhlberg, Sture Andersson, Bo Berglund, Håkan Eriksson, Jan Eriksson, Thomas Eriksson, Leif Holmgren, Tomas Jonsson, Pelle Lindbergh, William Löfqvist, Harald Lückner, Bengt Lundholm, Per Lundqvist, Lars Molin, Mats Näslund, Lennart Norberg, Tommy Samuelsson, Dan Söderström, Mats Waltin, Ulf Weinstock

United States
Bill Baker, Neal Broten, Dave Christian, Steve Christoff, Jim Craig, Mike Eruzione, John Harrington, Steve Janaszak, Mark Johnson, Rob McClanahan, Ken Morrow, Jack O'Callahan, Mark Pavelich, Mike Ramsey, William Schneider, Dave Silk, Bob Suter, Eric Strobel, Phil Verchota, Mark Wells

West Germany
Klaus Auhuber, Uli Egen, Bernhard Englbrecht, Hermann Hinterstocker, Martin Hinterstocker, Ernst Höfner, Udo Kiessling, Horst-Peter Kretschmer, Harald Krüll, Marcus Kuhl, Holger Meitinger, Rainer Philipp, Joachim Reil, Franz Reindl, Peter Scharf, Sigmund Suttner, Gerd Truntschka, Vladimír Vacátko, Martin Wild, Hans Zach

References

Sources

Hockey Hall Of Fame page on the 1980 Olympics

rosters
1980